Alison Edith Debenham (later Le Plat; 1903-1967) was a British painter and artist.

Biography
Debenham was born in 1903 to Sir Ernest Ridley Debenham, 1st Baronet, and his wife, Lady Cicely, of the Debenhams department store family business. After attending a finishing school in Paris, Alison Debenham studied at the Slade School of Art in London from 1923 to 1926. In 1928 she returned to live in Paris before, in 1929, moving to the south of France where she studied with the French painter Simon Bussy. There she met several prominent artists and authors including André Gide and Henri Matisse and, in 1930, married artist Rene Le Plat.

Throughout her artistic career, Debenham mostly painted portraits of friends and family members but also created a series of portraits of the workers on her father's estate. She regularly exhibited in both London and Paris and her first solo exhibition was at the Galerie Vignon in Paris in 1932. 

In 1935 she had a solo show at the Zwemmer Gallery in London and for a time she was associated with the Euston Road School of artists. A memorial exhibition for Debenham was held at the Richmond Hill Gallery in 1968 and a further retrospective was mounted by the Belgrave Gallery in London in 1976.

References

Further reading
Alison Debenham, introduction by Claude Rogers, The Belgrave Gallery, London, 1976.

External links

1903 births
1967 deaths
20th-century English painters
20th-century English women
20th-century British women artists
Alumni of the Slade School of Fine Art
Daughters of baronets
Alison
English women painters